Friedrich Johannes Hugo "F. H." von Engelken (1881–1963) was Director of the United States Mint from 1916 to 1917.

Biography 

F. H. von Engelken was born in Denmark in 1881. He later moved to Florida. He married Louisiana Breckenridge Hart Gibson in 1906. He divorced his first wife, and married Kate Walton, prominent attorney from Palatka, Florida, in 1953.  

In 1908, President of the United States Theodore Roosevelt appointed Engelken a member of the American Commission, which studied rural credits in Western Europe. Engelken authored a minority report that later was incorporated into the Federal Farm Loan Act of 1916, which created the Farm Credit System.

In 1916, President Woodrow Wilson named Engelken Director of the United States Mint. He held this office from September 1916 to March 1917.

In 1917, Engelken became president of the Federal Land Bank of the Third District. He later became head of bond sales for the Farm Loan Board.

Toward the end of World War I, United States Secretary of War Newton D. Baker recommended that Engelken be commissioned a major of engineers. In 1919, he traveled to Europe to report on economic conditions.

References 

1881 births
1930 deaths
Danish emigrants to the United States
Directors of the United States Mint
Woodrow Wilson administration personnel